In enzymology, a D-methionine—pyruvate transaminase is an enzyme that catalyzes the chemical reaction

D-methionine + pyruvate  4-methylthio-2-oxobutanoate + L-alanine

Thus, the two substrates of this enzyme are D-methionine and pyruvate, whereas its two products are 4-methylthio-2-oxobutanoate and L-alanine.

This enzyme belongs to the family of transferases, specifically the transaminases, which transfer nitrogenous groups.  The systematic name of this enzyme class is D-methionine:pyruvate aminotransferase. Other names in common use include D-methionine transaminase, and D-methionine aminotransferase.  This enzyme participates in d-alanine metabolism.

References

 

EC 2.6.1
Enzymes of unknown structure